Oksskolten (lit. Bulls Head) is a mountain in the municipality of Hemnes in Nordland County, Norway. The mountain lies just south of the lake Gresvatnet in the Okstindan mountain range east of the village of Korgen and north of the lake Røssvatnet.

The first recorded climb was by Peder Stordal in 1883. In order to get to the summit, climbers must cross the glacier to the north.  The large Okstindbreen glacier lies to the west of the mountain.

Gallery

See also
 List of highest points of Norwegian counties

References

Hemnes
Mountains of Nordland
Highest points of Norwegian counties
One-thousanders of Norway